Jeffery Todd Graham (born February 14, 1969) is a retired professional American football player who was drafted by the Pittsburgh Steelers in the second round of the 1991 NFL Draft. A 6'2", 206-lb wide receiver from Kettering, Archbishop Alter High School and Ohio State University, Graham played in 11 NFL seasons from 1991 to 2001 for the Steelers, the Chicago Bears, the New York Jets, the Philadelphia Eagles, and the San Diego Chargers.

Graham's best season as a professional came during the 1995 season with the Bears, when he had 82 receptions for 1,301 yards and four touchdowns.
At Alter High School, Graham was a two-way starter in his sophomore, junior and senior years. He played wide receiver on offense and safety on defense. He played an important role in helping the Knights reach the 1984 State Semifinals. In his senior year he was moved to quarterback and was successful in running the wishbone offense for the Knights. Graham was a 1st Team All-State basketball player and had many scholarship offers from big-name schools.

Personal life
Graham's house was destroyed by a lightning storm on Thursday June 28, 2007. Graham is the uncle of former University of Michigan wide receiver Roy Roundtree.
Graham coaches Division III high school football at Trotwood-Madison High School, in Ohio, where his team won the 2019 state championship.

References

1969 births
Living people
American football wide receivers
Chicago Bears players
New York Jets players
Ohio State Buckeyes football players
Philadelphia Eagles players
Pittsburgh Steelers players
San Diego Chargers players
Players of American football from Dayton, Ohio